Julia Jones, formerly also known as Julia Thorogood, is an English writer, editor, book publisher, aged-care advocate and classic yacht owner.

Early life
Julia Jones was born in Woodbridge, Suffolk in 1954. When she was 3 years old, her father George Jones bought the wooden sailing ketch Peter Duck, a yacht originally commissioned and owned by children's novelist Arthur Ransome and named for a character in one of his novels. This nautical connection with Ransome, along with numerous pony books, helped to shape a lifelong enthusiasm for books.

Writer and publisher
Jones opened a bookshop in Ingatestone, Essex, which she then developed into a small-scale local publishing business, reissuing a Second World War autobiography by crime writer Margery Allingham. Jones's interest in the Allingham family grew; she researched Margery Allingham's life and wrote a biography published in 1991. Jones has also studied the fiction writing of Margery Allingham's father, Herbert Allingham.

In 2006, while working on a PhD on Herbert Allingham, Jones decided to become a writer of adventure stories like the Swallows and Amazons series of Arthur Ransome she had read as a child. The Salt-Stained Book, the first part of a planned sailing adventure trilogy, was released in June 2011. Jones hoped the trilogy would inspire a new generation of children to mess about in boats.

Aged-care advocacy
In November 2014, Jones and co-founder Nicci Gerrard set up an aged-care advocacy group, John's Campaign, to promote extended visiting rights for family carers of patients with dementia in hospitals in the United Kingdom.

Personal life
Jones has five children. She was previously married to Chris Thorogood; in 2019 she married Francis Wheen, a writer, journalist and broadcaster who is deputy editor of Private Eye.

Bibliography
Books by Julia Jones:
 Uncommon Courage: The yachtsmen volunteers of World War Two  January 1, 2021
 (edited/published) The Cruise of Naromis: August in the Baltic 1939 by G. A. Jones  January 5, 2017
 Margery Allingham & Julia Jones Beloved Old Age and What To Do About It: Margery Allingham's 'The Relay' handed on to Julia Jones , June 30, 2016
 Fifty Years in the Fiction Factory: The working life of Herbert Allingham  September 19, 2012
 Strong Winds series:
 The Salt-Stained Book (Strong Winds vol. 1)  June 16, 2011
 A Ravelled Flag (Strong Winds vol. 2)  November 1, 2011
 Ghosting Home (Strong Winds vol. 3)  July 2, 2012
 The Lion of Sole Bay (Strong Winds vol. 4)  October 7, 2013
 Black Waters (Strong Winds vol. 5)  July 2, 2015
 Pebble (Strong Winds vol. 6)  November 15, 2018
 (edited/published) Cheapjack. Being the True History of a Young Man's Adventures as a Fortune Teller, Grafter, Knocker-Worker, and Mounted Pitcher on the Market-Places and Fair-grounds of a Modern But Still Romantic England by Philip Allingham,  republished July 1, 2010
 The Adventures of Margery Allingham  March 2, 2009
 (writing as Julia Thorogood) Margery Allingham: A Biography,  October 14, 1991
 (published) The Oaken Heart: The Story of an English Village at War, by Margery Allingham,  re-issued 1988 and March 3, 2011
 (edited/published, as Julia Thorogood) Yesterday's Heroes, by June Jones, January 1, 1986

References

External links
Author's website

1954 births
British children's writers
Living people